The Fire Trap is a 1935 American drama film directed by Burt P. Lynwood and starring Norman Foster, Evalyn Knapp and Sidney Blackmer. An insurance investigator goes on the trail of a gang of arsonists.

Cast
 Norman Foster as Bill Farnsworth  
 Evalyn Knapp as Betty Marshall  
 Sidney Blackmer as Cedric McIntyre  
 Oscar Apfel as R.A. Rawson  
 Ben Alexander as Bob Fender  
 Herbert Corthell as Commodore Brunton  
 Marie Callahan as Secretary

References

Bibliography
 Pitts, Michael R. Poverty Row Studios, 1929–1940: An Illustrated History of 55 Independent Film Companies, with a Filmography for Each. McFarland & Company, 2005.

External links
 

1935 films
1935 crime drama films
American crime drama films
American black-and-white films
Films directed by Burt P. Lynwood
1930s English-language films
1930s American films